The 3rd constituency of the Var (French: Troisième circonscription du Var) is a French legislative constituency in the Var département. Like the other 576 French constituencies, it elects one MP using the two-round system, with a run-off if no candidate receives over 50% of the vote in the first round.

Description

The 3rd constituency of the Var is centred on Hyères to the west of Toulon.

It has been a strongly right leaning constituency for all of its recent history, including the election of the only National Front deputy in 1988. That winner Yann Piat subsequently joined the Union for French Democracy before being assassinated in 1994.

Assembly Members

Election results

2022

 
 
 
|-
| colspan="8" bgcolor="#E9E9E9"|
|-

2017

 
 
 
 
 
 
|-
| colspan="8" bgcolor="#E9E9E9"|
|-

2012

 
 
 
 
|-
| colspan="8" bgcolor="#E9E9E9"|
|-

2007

 
 
 
 
 
 
 
|-
| colspan="8" bgcolor="#E9E9E9"|
|-

2002

 
 
 
 
 
 
|-
| colspan="8" bgcolor="#E9E9E9"|
|-

1997

 
 
 
 
 
 
 
 
|-
| colspan="8" bgcolor="#E9E9E9"|
|-
 
 

 
 
 
 
 

* PS dissident

References

3